Otis Manson (died 1862) was an architect in Richmond, Virginia known for his residential building designs. Richmond architect. He died in North Carolina.

Captain Manson served in the War of 1812, in Captain Richardson's corps d'elite for the defending Richmond, was a member of the City Council, and was one of the first architects in Virginia. He designed the Union Hotel for Mayor Adams.

Albert F. Huntt was his great-grandson.

References

Further reading
Otis Manson's early years in Richmond January 1, 1986 by Sarah Shields Driggs

Year of birth missing
1862 deaths
American architects
American military personnel of the War of 1812